William Stratton Mills (born 1 July 1932) is a retired solicitor and former politician in Northern Ireland.

He was the first Member of Parliament (MP) for the Alliance Party of Northern Ireland to sit in the British House of Commons, until Naomi Long won Belfast East in 2010.

Life
The son of Dr V.J.S. Mills, CBE, RM, Mills was educated at Campbell College, Belfast and Queen's University, Belfast.  A solicitor by profession, Mills was elected as the Ulster Unionist Party (UUP) MP for Belfast North in the 1959 general election.  He held his seat in subsequent elections, but in 1972 he refused to join the other UUP MPs in resigning the Conservative Party whip.  He instead resigned from the UUP, describing himself as an independent Unionist and Conservative MP.

In August 1969, at the outset of The Troubles, Mills travelled with Robin Bailie to the United States to counter the fund raising efforts of Bernadette Devlin, and to promote the Unionist point of view to an American audience. Mills referred to Miss Devlin as "a female Castro in a miniskirt" and questioned if the funds collected were to be used for Catholic relief or to further violence. Miss Devlin responded that the $200,000 in contributions was to be administered by the Northern Ireland Civil Rights Association for the benefit of riot victims. 

In 1973, Mills joined the Alliance Party of Northern Ireland. He retired from the House in 1974.  He was also a partner in a solicitors firm, and currently serves on Northern Ireland's Historic Buildings Council. Mills is a member of the Ulster Architectural Heritage Society and the Irish Georgian Society. He lives in Malone Park, Belfast.

Following the death of Robert Lindsay, 29th Earl of Crawford on 18 March 2023, Mills and Lord Morris of Aberavon became the surviving former MPs with the earliest date of first election, having first entered Parliament at the 1959 general election.

References

Lords Hansard text for 3 Jul 1996 (160703-12)

External links 
 

1932 births
Living people
Alliance Party of Northern Ireland MPs
Ulster Unionist Party members of the House of Commons of the United Kingdom
Lawyers from Belfast
UK MPs 1959–1964
UK MPs 1964–1966
UK MPs 1966–1970
UK MPs 1970–1974
People educated at Campbell College
Alumni of Queen's University Belfast
Conservative Party (UK) MPs
Members of the Parliament of the United Kingdom for Belfast constituencies (since 1922)